The 1955 Cupa României was the 18th edition of Romania's most prestigious football cup competition.

The title was won by CCA București against Progresul Oradea.

Format
The competition is an annual knockout tournament.

In the first round proper, two pots were made, first pot with Divizia A teams and other teams till 16 and the second pot with the rest of teams qualified in this phase. First pot teams will play away. Each tie is played as a single leg.

If a match is drawn after 90 minutes, the game goes in extra time, and if the scored is still tight after 120 minutes, the team who plays away will qualify.

In case the teams are from same city, there a replay will be played.

In case the teams play in the final, there a replay will be played.

From the first edition, the teams from Divizia A entered in competition in sixteen finals, rule which remained till today.

First round proper

|colspan=3 style="background-color:#FFCCCC;"|13 October 1955
 
 

 
 

 

 

 

|}

Second round proper

|colspan=3 style="background-color:#FFCCCC;"|2 November 1955 
 
 
 
 

|-
|colspan=3 style="background-color:#FFCCCC;"|3 November 1955 

|}

Quarter-finals 

|colspan=3 style="background-color:#FFCCCC;"|23 November 1955  
 
 

|}

Semi-finals

|colspan=3 style="background-color:#FFCCCC;"|4 December 1955  

|-
|colspan=3 style="background-color:#FFCCCC;"|11 December 1955  

|}

Final

References

External links
 romaniansoccer.ro
 Official site
 The Romanian Cup on the FRF's official site

Cupa României seasons
Cupa Romaniei
Romania